Farea Al-Muslimi is a Yemeni writer and activist.

Education 

He holds a bachelor's degree in public policy from American University of Beirut.

Career 

He delivered a speech before members of the U.S. Congress against which strikes U.S. drone in Yemen and highlighted the price paid by innocent civilians in Yemen because of those attacks. He wrote an editorial on the situation.

Foreign Policy magazine included him in its annual list of the 100 most preeminent global thinkers in 2013. He was the second-youngest person in the world on the list (older than Malala Yousafzai).

He was the first Yemeni to deliver a speech to the U.S. Congress and the second Yemeni included in the list of Foreign Policy, following Tawakkol Karman who won the Nobel Peace Prize.

References 

Yemeni writers